Eight Iron Men is a 1952 American World War II drama film directed by Edward Dmytryk and produced by Stanley Kramer. It stars Bonar Colleano, Arthur Franz, Lee Marvin, Richard Kiley and Mary Castle. Lee Marvin's powerful performance as the squad's leader ratchets up the suspense along with Dmytryk's noir style direction and J. Roy Hunt's deft cinematography. The screenplay by Harry Brown was based on his 1945 play A Sound of Hunting, which had featured Sam Levene, Frank Lovejoy and Burt Lancaster during its short run on Broadway ("Burton" Lancaster had played Lee Marvin's role in the original play).

Plot
Three American infantrymen—Carter (Arthur Franz), Ferguson (James Griffith) and Small (George Cooper)—are returning from patrol in a bombed-out town when they are pinned down by an enemy  machine gun. Meanwhile, Coke (Richard Kiley), who was separated from the patrol, returns on his own to the squad's basement outpost where goof-off Private Collucci (Bonar Colleano) is sleeping, dreaming of beautiful women. A runner from company headquarters delivers a package for a squad member and tells the men that the regiment is moving out of the line that night. Shortly after another patrol returns with Sgt. Mooney (Lee Marvin) and privates Spiros (Nick Dennis) and Muller (Dickie Moore).

Muller opens the package and finds a fruitcake, which he divides eight ways. Carter and Ferguson manage to get back, but the clumsy Small has been left behind, trapped in a shell hole by the machine gun fire. Sgt. Mooney wants to send out a rescue party, and persuades his platoon leader Lt. Crane (Richard Grayson) to take the request to Capt. Trelawny (Barney Phillips), their company commander. A sniper kills Crane before he reaches the company command post. Mooney goes to Trelawny but the captain orders Mooney not to attempt a rescue, saying that while he doesn't want to leave Small, he also doesn't want to lose men on what seems to be a "wild-goose chase." The men debate the pros and cons of going after Small while Collucci tries to persuade Muller to let him eat Small's piece of fruitcake.

A runner alerts the squad that the company is pulling out in half an hour but another burst of machine gun fire galvanizes Mooney. He disobeys orders and with Coke, Muller, and a mortar, goes for Small. The mortar fire fails to silence the gun, however. Trelawny hears the exploding shells and angrily heads to the squad's outpost where he confronts Carter for not stopping Mooney. Collucci goes out while the two argue, but Carter persuades the captain to overlook the disobedience.

Mooney returns saying they couldn't get close, but if Small had still been alive, he would have made a break for it during the mortar fire. When Collucci is nearly shot by the sniper and returns fire, the squad realizes that he has gone alone to retrieve Small. Using a destroyed tank as cover to get close, he tosses grenades that destroy the machine gun nest. Collucci returns as the squad is rolling up its gear to move out, carrying Small. It turns out that Small sprained his ankle, injected himself with morphine, and slept through the whole ordeal. As all eight men leave their former home, Collucci eats the last piece of fruitcake.

Cast

 Bonar Colleano as Pvt. Collucci
 Arthur Franz as Carter
 Lee Marvin as Sgt. Joe Mooney
 Richard Kiley as Pvt. Coke
 Nick Dennis as Pvt. Spiros
 James Griffith as Pvt. Ferguson
 Dickie Moore as Pvt. Muller (as Dick Moore)
 George Cooper as Pvt. Small
 Barney Phillips as Captain Trelawny
 Robert Nichols as Walsh
 Richard Grayson as Lieutenant Crane
 Douglas Henderson as Hunter
 Mary Castle as Girl
 Angela Stevens as Girl in Daydream (uncredited)
 Kathleen O'Malley as Girl in Daydream (uncredited)
 Sue Casey as Girl in Daydream (uncredited)

References

External links
 
 
 
 

1952 films
1952 drama films
1950s war drama films
1950s English-language films
American black-and-white films
American World War II films
American films based on plays
Films directed by Edward Dmytryk
Columbia Pictures films
Films with screenplays by Harry Brown (writer)
Films produced by Stanley Kramer
Films scored by Leith Stevens
Italian Campaign of World War II films
American war drama films
1950s American films